James Thraves (1869–1936) was an English footballer who played in the Football League for Leicester Fosse and Notts County.

References

1868 births
1936 deaths
Footballers from Derby
English footballers
Association football goalkeepers
Notts County F.C. players
Leicester City F.C. players
Long Eaton Rangers F.C. players
English Football League players
People from Normanton, Derby
FA Cup Final players